Harry "Doc" J. Huff (June 3, 1880 – May 29, 1964) was an American athlete.  He competed at the 1908 Summer Olympics in London.

He was born in Cedar Twp., Van Buren Co., Iowa to James K Polk Huff and Eleanor Virginia née: Sheldon Huff, and died in Kansas City, Missouri.

In the 100 metres, Huff won his first round heat with a time of 11.4 seconds, one of the slower winning times.  He dropped his time to 11.1 seconds in his semifinal race to finish second behind eventual silver medallist James Rector who tied the Olympic record at 10.8 seconds.

Huff also won his preliminary heat in the 200 metres with a time 22.8 seconds.  He came in last in his three-man semifinal race, running the distance in 23.0 seconds.

References

Sources
 
 
 
 

1881 births
1964 deaths
People from Van Buren County, Iowa
Athletes (track and field) at the 1908 Summer Olympics
Olympic track and field athletes of the United States
American male sprinters
USA Outdoor Track and Field Championships winners